The Waterloo Wellington LHIN is one of fourteen Local Health Integration Networks (LHINs) in the Canadian province of Ontario.

The Waterloo Wellington Local Health Integration Network is a community-based, non-profit organization funded by the Government of Ontario through the Ministry of Health and Long-Term Care.

Services
Waterloo Wellington LHIN plans, funds and coordinates the following operational public health care services to a population of approximately 685,400 people:

 Hospitals
 Cambridge Memorial Hospital (Cambridge, ON)
 Groves Memorial Hospital (Fergus, ON)
 Guelph General Hospital (Guelph, ON)
 St Joseph's Health Care Guelph (Guelph, ON)
 St. Mary's General Hospital (Kitchener, ON)
 Grand River Hospital (Kitchener, ON)
 Louise Marshall Hospital (Mount Forest, ON)
 Palmerston and District Hospital (Palmerston, ON)
 Long-Term Care Homes
 Community Care Access Centre (CCAC)
 Community Support Service Agencies
 Mental Health and Addiction Agencies
 Community Health Centres (CHCs)

Geographic area
Waterloo Wellington LHIN services a region that includes all of Wellington County, the Regional Municipality of Waterloo, and the City of Guelph.  It also includes part of Grey County, which is split with South West LHIN and North Simcoe Muskoka LHIN.

Budget
The Waterloo Wellington LHIN has an annual budget of approximately $875 million.

External links
 Waterloo Wellington LHIN - official web site

References

Health regions of Ontario